This is a list of Honorary Fellows of Peterhouse, Cambridge. A list of current honorary fellows is published on the college's website at Fellows by Seniority.

 Sir Hugh Beach
 Alfred Brendel
 Malcolm Budd
 Elizabeth Butler-Sloss, Baroness Butler-Sloss
 Sir Ian Corder
 Adrian Dixon
 Sir Richard Eyre
 Sir Nicholas Fenn
 Chan Gunn
 Ian Hacking
 Angela Hewitt
 Michael Howard, Baron Howard of Lympne
 Sir John Kendrew
 Sir Aaron Klug
 Michael Levitt
 Anthony Lloyd, Baron Lloyd of Berwick
 Michael Loewe
 Denis Mack Smith
 Sir Noel Malcolm
 Simon McBurney
 Sir Sam Mendes
 Sir Christopher Meyer
 Sir Declan Morgan
 Karen O'Brien
 Klaus Roth
 Edward Shils
 Nicholas Stern, Baron Stern of Brentford
 James Stirling
 Sir John Meurig Thomas
 Martin Thomas, Baron Thomas of Gresford
 David Wilson, Baron Wilson of Tillyorn
 Sir David Wright
 Sir Tony Wrigley

References

Fellows by Seniority

Fellows of Peterhouse, Cambridge
Peterhouse, Cambridge
Peterhouse